First Unitarian Society usually designates a humanist Unitarian/Unitarian Universalist congregation, and may refer to:

First Unitarian Society, Minneapolis, established 1881, birthplace of religious humanism
First Unitarian Society in Newton, Massachusetts (1906)
First Unitarian Society Meetinghouse, Shorewood Hills, Madison, Wisconsin (1951), a National Historic Landmark and NRHP-listed

See also
Unitarian Society (disambiguation)
First Unitarian Church (disambiguation)
List of Unitarian churches

Unitarian Universalism